Servay Hypermarket (S) Sdn. Bhd. (doing business as Servay and Parkwell) is a hypermarket and retailer chain in Malaysia. It is one of the main existing retailer in East Malaysia, having over 30 branches (supermarket, hypermarket & convenient store) spread throughout Sabah and Sarawak. It was founded by Dato Sri Lai Kock Poh in 1990.

History 
The company history dated back to the year 1979 when Evergreen Trading was set up. The first Servay Supermarket was established in 1990  in Miri, Sarawak. Since then, more outlets were established to meet the increase demands from the public. The company expand their supermarket and hypermarket chain to Sabah in 1997. At the moment, Servay have more outlets in Sabah than any other places.

Chains

Servay Hypermarket, Supermarket & Jaya. 
Here are the list of branches in both Sabah and Sarawak:

Supermarket and Departmental Stores (Miri, Sarawak) (opened 1990)
Parkwell Departmental Stores (Miri, Sarawak) (opened 1994)
Servay Hypermarket (Penampang, Kota Kinabalu, Sabah) (opened 1997; burned down in 2008; re-opened 2010)
Servay Supermarket (Sandakan, Sabah) (opened 1999)
Parkwell Departmental Stores (Sandakan, Sabah) (opened 2000)
Servay Hypermarket (Tawau, Sabah) and Servay Hypermarket (KK Plaza, Sabah) (opened 2001)
Servay Hypermarket (Likas, Kota Kinabalu) and Servay Hypermarket (Miri Plaza, Miri) (opened 2003)
Servay Hypermarket (Sandakan, Sabah) (burned down in 2014) and Servay Jaya Superstore (Taman Tunku, Miri, Sarawak) (opened 2005)
Servay Jaya Superstore (Keningau, Sabah) (opened 2007)
Servay Hypermarket (Putatan, Sabah) (opened 2008)
Servay Jaya Superstore (Tawau, Sabah) (opened 2009)
Servay Hypermarket (Lahad Datu, Sabah) (opened 2011)
Servay Hypermarket (Kota Samarahan, Sarawak) (2013-2021 - Has ceased operation since March 2021)
Servay Hypermarket (King Centre, Kuching, Sarawak) (2014-2019 - Has ceased operation since April 2019)
Servay Jaya (Kota Marudu, Sabah) (opened 2015)
Servay Jaya (Beaufort, Sabah) and Servay Hypermarket (Inanam, Sabah) (opened 2016)
Servay Jaya (Kota Samarahan, Sarawak), Servay Premier (Centre Point, Kota Kinabalu, Sabah), Servay Jaya (Benoni, Sabah), Servay Jaya (Kinabatangan, Sabah), Servay Jaya (Sipitang, Sabah) (opened 2018)
Servay Jaya (Sejati Walk, Sandakan, Sabah) (Opened in March 2019)
Servay Hypermarket (Papar, Sabah) (Opened in June 2019)
Servay Jaya Supermarket (Kudat, Sabah) (Opened in October 2019)
servay Jaya Sungai Tajong (Tawau, Sabah) (Opened in April 2020) 
servay Jaya Kunak (Kunak, Sabah) (Opened in July 2020 ) 
Servay Hypermarket Permy Mall (Miri, Sarawak) (Opened in April 2021)
Servay Jaya Supermarket Senadin (Senadin, Sarawak) (TBA)
Servay Jaya Supermarket Lahad Datu (Lahad Datu, Sabah) (TBA)

Servay Express & Servay Mart 
In 2018, Servay group have expanded their businesses from a full scale Hypermarket & supermarket to convenient stores. These stores are known as Servay Express & Servay Mart. 
Although Servay Express & Servay Mart shares the  same concept of operating as convenient store, the difference between these two are their location. Whereby Servay Express operated in East Malaysia while Servay Mart operated in West Malaysia.

Servay Express
Servay Express Kimanis (March 2018)
Servay Express Lumat (September 2018)
Servay Express Rugading (October 2018)
Servay Express Tuaran (November 2018)
Servay Express Beaufort (December 2018)
Servay Express Kivatu (February 2019)
Servay Express Kinarut (April 2019)
Servay Express One Place Mall Putatan (May 2019)
Servay Express Taman Fulliwa Menggatal (June 2019)
Servay Express Langkon (December 2019)
Servay Express Tanjung Aru (September 2020)
Servay Express Karamunsing (November 2020)
Servay Express Kepayan Point (January 2021)
Servay Express Api-Api (TBA)
Servay Express Lok Kawi (TBA)

Servay Mart – at the moment, Servay Mart stores are only operating in Kelantan.
Servay Mart Sri Cemerlang
Servay Mart Jalan Hospital
Servay Mart Wakaf Bharu
Servay Mart Wakaf Che Yeh
Servay Mart Kg. Kebakat
Servay Mart Pengkalan Chepa
Servay Mart Kg. Sireh
Servay Mart Pasir Puteh

Servay Online. 
Since the third quarter of 2019, Servay had expanded their business with the introduction of Servay online. At the moment, the service is only provided to customers in East Malaysia.

See also 

 List of hypermarkets in Malaysia

References

External links 
 
 Servay Hypermarket (S) Sdn Bhd,
 

1990 establishments in Malaysia
Hypermarkets
Supermarkets of Malaysia
Malaysian companies established in 1990
Retail companies established in 1990
Privately held companies of Malaysia